Deli Ji-ye Gholam (also Romanized as Delī Jī-ye Gholām and Delījī Gholām; also known as Delīrch and Delīrech) is a village in Poshteh-ye Zilayi Rural District, Sarfaryab District, Charam County, Kohgiluyeh and Boyer-Ahmad Province, Iran. At the 2006 census, its population was 36, in 6 families.

References 

Populated places in Charam County